Windward Caribbean Creole English may refer to:
Vincentian Creole
Grenadian Creole